Four ships of the Royal Navy have borne the name HMS Cordelia, named after the legendary Queen of the Britons:

  was a 10-gun  launched in 1808. She was sold in 1833.
  was an 11-gun  wooden screw sloop launched in 1856. She was sold in 1870.
  was a  screw corvette launched in 1881. She was sold in 1904.
  was a  light cruiser launched in 1914. She was sold in 1921.

References
 

Royal Navy ship names